Lester Wynne (7 October 1908 – 29 November 1980) was an Australian cricketer. He played two first-class cricket matches for Victoria between 1935 and 1936.

See also
 List of Victoria first-class cricketers

References

External links
 

1908 births
1980 deaths
Australian cricketers
Victoria cricketers
Cricketers from Melbourne